Pastor Tórrez (born 27 August 1990) is a retired Bolivian football striker.

References

1990 births
Living people
Sportspeople from Cochabamba
Bolivian footballers
Club Real Potosí players
Nacional Potosí players
Universitario de Sucre footballers
Club Petrolero players
Bolivian Primera División players
Association football forwards